"Dance Floor" is a song performed by American funk band Zapp, issued as the second single from their second studio album Zapp II. The song spent two weeks at No. 1 on the Billboard R&B singles chart.

Track listing
 12" single

Chart positions

References

External links
 
 

1982 songs
1982 singles
Zapp (band) songs
Songs written by Larry Troutman
Songs written by Roger Troutman
Song recordings produced by Roger Troutman
Warner Records singles